Chromobox homolog 7 is a protein that in humans is encoded by the CBX7 gene. The loss of CBX7 gene expression has been shown to correlate with a malignant form of thyroid cancer.

Model organisms 

Model organisms have been used in the study of CBX7 function. A conditional knockout mouse line, called Cbx7tm1a(KOMP)Wtsi was generated as part of the International Knockout Mouse Consortium program — a high-throughput mutagenesis project to generate and distribute animal models of disease to interested scientists — at the Wellcome Trust Sanger Institute. Male and female animals underwent a standardized phenotypic screen to determine the effects of deletion. Twenty six tests were carried out and three significant phenotypes were reported. Homozygous mutant female adults showed a decreased response to stress-induced hyperthermia and had an increased red blood cell count. Animals of both sex had an integument phenotype when tail epidermis was examined.

References

Further reading 
 
 
 
 
 
 

Human proteins
Genes mutated in mice